Zerynth is a software implementation of the Python programming language for programming microcontrollers. It targets 32-bit microcontroller platforms and is designed to mix Python with C code. It connects the microcontrollers to the Cloud for developing Internet of Things (IoT) products.

Zerynth is made for designers, engineers, programmers and IoT professionals for product designing and ideation without focusing on low-level configurations and programming.

Ecosystem  
Zerynth’s technology allows companies to acquire data from both their legacy machines and new industrial machines, to view data from an interactive dashboard, to receive real-time notifications, and integrates with their existing company’s ERP or other IT systems.

The Zerynth IoT Platform allows companies to acquire data from both legacy and new generation machinery, do real-time production monitoring, measure energy consumption, predict malfunctions, gain instant notifications and easily integrate with any existing ERP, MES, or BI systems.

Tools 
Zerynth Virtual Machine is a multithreaded stack-based virtual machine designed to execute a custom Python bytecode. It has a footprint of around 60-80kB of Flash and 
3-5kB of RAM, depending on the target platform and platform SDK. Zerynth VM allows development of Python programs that are independent of the hardware permitting code reusability and integration.

Zerynth Studio is a free, open-source cross-platform IDE empowered by a command line toolchain for provisioning microcontrollers with a Zerynth VM and developing Python programs for it.

Zerynth Advanced Device Manager (ADM) exposes an API-based interface to ease the cloud data forwarding, Firmware over-the-air (FOTA) updates, and Remote Procedure Calling. The software also has an app which allows users to prototype UI for devices programmed with Zerynth.

License 
 Zerynth Studio and VSCode Extension: Opensource Apache 2.0 License
 Zerynth OS: Closed Source. Distributed as binary.
 Zerynth Toolchain: Opensource Apache 2.0 License
 Zerynth Official Libraries: Opensource Apache 2.0 License
 Zerynth Cloud: Closed Source. Provided as SAAS or On-premises

Funding 
According to Tech.eu, as of November 2022, "Zerynth raised €5.3 million, which brings its lifetime funding  to €7.3 million, following a €2 million injection two years back. The funding round was led by United Ventures."

References 

Python (programming language) implementations